Rodney Klooster (born 26 November 1996) is a Dutch professional footballer who plays as a right back for Dinamo Tbilisi. Besides the Netherlands, he has played in Slovakia, Bulgaria, Finland, and Georgia.

Career
Rodney Klooster has a twin brother named Milton. He is also a footballer, currently playing for Excelsior Maassluis as a forward.

Klooster made his Fortuna Liga debut for AS Trenčín against Zemplín Michalovce on 12 March 2017.

References

External links
 
 
 Futbalnet Profile

Living people
1996 births
People from Vlaardingen
Dutch footballers
Dutch expatriate footballers
Association football defenders
FC Dordrecht players
AS Trenčín players
FC Eindhoven players
Botev Plovdiv players
FC Inter Turku players
FC Dinamo Tbilisi players
Eerste Divisie players
Slovak Super Liga players
First Professional Football League (Bulgaria) players
Dutch expatriate sportspeople in Slovakia
Expatriate footballers in Slovakia
Dutch expatriate sportspeople in Bulgaria
Expatriate footballers in Bulgaria
Dutch expatriate sportspeople in Finland
Expatriate footballers in Finland
Dutch expatriate sportspeople in Georgia (country)
Expatriate footballers in Georgia (country)
Footballers from South Holland